Amazing Blondel are an English acoustic progressive folk band, containing Eddie Baird, John Gladwin, and Terry Wincott. They released a number of LPs for Island Records in the early 1970s. They are sometimes categorised as psychedelic folk or as medieval folk rock, but their music was much more a reinvention of Renaissance music, based around the use of period instruments such as lutes and recorders.

History
John Gladwin (guitar and vocals) and Terrance (Terry) Wincott (guitar and vocals) formed a band called The Dimples along with Stuart Smith (drums) and Johnny Jackson (bass guitar). Signed to the Decca label they recorded a single, the "A" side "Love of a Lifetime" and the "B" side written by John Gladwin titled "My Heart is Tied to You". The record did not chart, although more recently the B-side has become popular on the Northern soul scene.
 
Following the break up of The Dimples John and Terry formed a loud "electric" band called Methuselah. However, at some point in Methuselah concerts, the duo would play an acoustic number together: they found that this went down well with the audiences and allowed them to bring out more of the subtlety of their singing and instrumental work. They left Methuselah in 1969 and began working on their own acoustic material.

Initially their material was derived from folk music, in line with many of the other performers of the time. However, they began to develop their own musical idiom, influenced, at one extreme, by the early music revivalists such as David Munrow, and the other extreme, by their childhood memories of the Robin Hood TV series, with its pseudo-mediaeval soundtrack by Elton Hayes.

The band was named after Blondel de Nesle, the musician in the court of Richard I. According to legend, when Richard was held prisoner, Blondel travelled through central Europe, singing at every castle to locate the King and assist his escape. This name for the band was suggested by a chef, Eugene McCoy, who listened to some of their songs and commented: "Oh, very Blondel!" and they began to use that name. They were then advised to add an adjective (in line, for example, with The Incredible String Band) and so they became "Amazing Blondel".

Their first album The Amazing Blondel (also called "Amazing Blondel and a Few Faces,") was recorded in 1969 and released by Bell Records. It was directed by session guitarist Big Jim Sullivan. At about this time, Eddie Baird (who had known the other members at school) joined the band. On 19 September 1970 they were one of the bands to play at the first Glastonbury Festival. Following what Baird described as "a disastrous 'showbiz' record signing", Amazing Blondel were introduced, by members of the band Free, to Chris Blackwell of Island Records and Artists.  Blackwell signed them up to Island, for whom they recorded their albums Evensong, Fantasia Lindum and England.

In Baird's words (in a 2003 interview) the band "adored recording". They recorded the Island albums in the company's Basing Street Studios which, at that time, was the source of some of the most innovative independent music in Britain.

They toured widely, both in their own concerts and as a support act for bands such as Genesis, Procol Harum and Steeleye Span. On stage, they aimed at technical precision of the music and versatility of instrumentation (with most concerts involving the use of some forty instruments) interspersed with banter and bawdy humour. However, there was a conflict between their managers' desires to organise ever more demanding tour schedules and the band's own wish to spend more time writing material and working in  the studio. In the end, this led to the departure of John Gladwin (who had written most of their material) from the band in 1973, and the remaining two members decided to continue as a duo. In this new format, they went on to record several more albums, with Baird now writing the bulk of the material. The first of these, Blondel, was their final release for Island. They were next signed to Dick James' DJM label, where they recorded three albums, Mulgrave Street, Inspiration and Bad Dreams.   They gradually modernised and electrified their sound. These albums featured a number of guest musicians, including Steve Winwood and Paul Kossoff. There is a mistaken belief that, during this period, they shortened the band name to Blondel. This is probably caused by the title of the final Island album, and the front cover of Mulgrave Street, which gives the short version of the name. But the full name is given on the back and on the front of the next two albums. The final release in the 1970s was a live album.

By the end of the 1970s, with disco being the largest selling music genre and with folk losing popularity, Baird and Wincott stopped performing under the Amazing Blondel name. John Gladwin reinherited the name and began to tour universities with bandmates, and former session players for the original Amazing Blondel; Adrian Hopkins and Paul Empson. This line-up had originally been billed as "John David Gladwin's Englishe Musicke".

The original band reformed in 1997 and produced a new album Restoration. They have since played at venues across  Europe in the period 1997–2000. As of 2005, Terry Wincott had a successful heart bypass operation, which curtailed the band's plans for future concerts.

In 2005, Eddie Baird played two concerts in a duo with acoustic guitarist and singer songwriter Julie Ellison and is currently working on a collaboration with Darryl Ebbatson, called "Ebbatson Baird".

Band membership
John David Gladwin and Edward Baird were born and brought up in Scunthorpe, Lincolnshire: Terence Alan Wincott was born in Hampshire but moved to Scunthorpe at an early age.

The members of the band were all accomplished musicians. Gladwin sang and played twelve-string guitar, lute, double bass, theorbo, cittern, tabor and tubular bells. Wincott sang and played 6 string guitar, harmonium, recorders, flute, ocarina, congas, crumhorn, pipe organ, tabor, harpsichord, piano, mellotron, bongos and assorted percussion. Baird sang and played lute, glockenspiel, cittern, dulcimer, twelve string guitar and percussion.

Style of music
The style of their music is difficult to categorise. Most of it was composed by themselves, but was based on the form and structure of Renaissance music, featuring, for example, pavanes, galliards and madrigals. It is sometimes categorised as psychedelic folk but would probably have been disowned by both the psychedelic community and the folk community, whilst being instantly recognisable to students of early music. Terry Wincott described it as "pseudo-Elizabethan/Classical acoustic music sung with British accents". Eddie Baird is quoted as saying "People used to ask us, How would you describe your music? Well, there was no point asking us, we didn't have a clue."

Their music has been compared with that of Gryphon and Pentangle: however, Amazing Blondel did not embrace the rock influences of the former nor the folk and jazz influences of the latter. They have also been likened to Jethro Tull.

Instruments
The band employed a wide range of instruments (see above) but, central to their sound was their use of the lute and recorders.

When touring, the lutes proved to be quite difficult instruments for stage performance (in terms of amplification and tuning) and, in 1971, the band commissioned the construction of two 7-string guitars, which could be played in lute tuning. The design and construction of these instruments was undertaken by David Rubio who made classical guitars, lutes, and other early instruments for classical players, including Julian Bream and John Williams.

Gladwin's instrument was designed to have slightly more of a bass sound, as it was used mainly as an accompaniment instrument, whereas Baird's had a little bit more treble emphasis, to allow his melodic playing in the higher register to predominate. The two instruments were individually successful and also blended well together. They also proved to be stable (from a tuning point of view) for stage performance. The guitars were fitted with internal microphones to simplify amplification.

Discography

Studio albums

Other releases
 Live in Tokyo (1977) (actually this live album was recorded in Europe)
Englishe Musicke (compilation), Edsel Records, (1993)
A Foreign Field That Is Forever England (recorded live, 1972–1973) HTD Records (1996)
Evensong/Fantasia Lindum, Beat Goes On 626 (2004)
Going Where The Music Takes Me (Live & Studio Archive recordings From The 60's To the 80's) (2-CD-Box + DVD), Shakedown Records (2004)(Compilation with 38 unreleased songs; no Amazing Blondel recordings but songs by the individual members)
Harvest of gold - The English Folk Almanach (Live sampler including recordings from Steeleye Span; Fairport Convention and Magna Carta as well as five live recordings by Amazing Blondel from the early 1970s which are otherwise unreleased)

References

External links
Blondel CD re-issues and latest news on their reformation courtesy of Talking Elephant
The last snapshot of the official site of Amazing Blondel
The last snapshot of the official site of the Ebbatson-Baird project

English folk musical groups
English progressive rock groups
Medieval folk rock groups
Psychedelic folk groups
Bell Records artists
Island Records artists
DJM Records artists
Transatlantic Records artists
Mooncrest Records artists